Anthony Fernandes (6 July 1936 – 3 February 2023) was an Indian prelate of the Catholic Church who served as the first Bishop of the Diocese of Bareilly from 1989 until his retirement in 2014.

Early life 
Bishop Anthony was born in Kalathur, Udupi on 6 July 1936, to David and Bridgit Fernandes.

Priesthood 
After his high school studies at Don Bosco School, Shriva, Anthony joined the diocese of Varanasi. He completed his initial formation at St Paul’s Minor Seminary, in Lucknow followed by Philosophy and Theology at St Joseph’s Regional Seminary in Allahabad. He was ordained to the priesthood during the Eucharistic Congress held in Mumbai on 2 December 1964.

Anthony worked as a priest in Varanasi and Gorakhpur for 26 years and felt deeply responsible for the poor and the needy in those regions. During his pastoral ministry, he worked ardently for the education of children and the empowerment of women.

Episcopate 
On 19 January 1989, Pope John Paul II took the momentous decision of erecting a new Diocese-the Diocese of Bareilly by promulgating the Bull “Indorum Inter Gentes”. By this Bull, six districts of the Diocese of Lucknow in the state of Uttar Pradesh namely, Bareilly, Nainital, Almora, Pithoragarh, Shahjahanpur and Pilibhit were carved out to form the new Diocese of Bareilly and the church of St. Alphonsus was designated as its Cathedral. The newly erected diocese was made a suffragan of the Archdiocese of Agra.

On the same day, the Holy Father appointed and proclaimed Very Rev. Anthony Fernandes, Vicar General of the Diocese of Varanasi as the Bishop-elect of the newly erected Diocese, by promulgating the Bull “Eodem Animi Pastoralis”. 

Fernandes' ordination as the first Bishop of Bareilly followed on 29 March 1989 at St Alphonsus Cathedral, Bareilly.

Death
Fernandes died from multiple organ failure in Delhi, on 3 February 2023, at the age of 86.

References

External links
Diocese of Bareilly
Anthony Fernandes at Roman Catholic Hierarchy

1936 births
2023 deaths 
Deaths from multiple organ failure
20th-century Roman Catholic bishops in India
21st-century Roman Catholic bishops in India
Bishops appointed by Pope John Paul II
Christian clergy from Mangalore